Goran Stojković (born 6 December 1983) is a Serbian football defender who plays for Prva Petoletka in Serbian League East.

References

External links
 
 

1983 births
Living people
Sportspeople from Kruševac
Association football defenders
Serbian footballers
FK Napredak Kruševac players
FK Sinđelić Niš players
Serbian SuperLiga players
FK Berane players
FK Mornar players
Montenegrin First League players